Keria may refer to:

 Keria Ibrahim, Ethiopian politician

 Keria (Greek island) also known as Keros
 Keriya County, county in Xinjiang, China
 Keriya Town, town in Keriya County
 Keriya River, river in Xinjiang
 Keria (journal), academic journal from Slovenia